Rupal is a village development committee in Dadeldhura District in the Mahakali Zone of western Nepal. At the time of the 1991 Nepal census it had a population of 4531 people living in 779 individual households.

References

External links
UN map of the municipalities of  Dadeldhura District

Populated places in Dadeldhura District